Herbert Benjamin Harris (April 24, 1913 – January 18, 1991) is a former Major League Baseball pitcher. Born in Chicago, Illinois, he attended college at Northwestern University. He played four games in his MLB career, in 1936 with the Philadelphia Phillies posting a career 10.29 ERA.

Prior to his MLB debut, Harris played for the Ponca City Angels in the Western Association (1934), Los Angeles Angels in the Pacific Coast League (1935), and Des Moines Demons in the Western League (1935).

Harris died on January 18, 1991, in Crystal Lake, Illinois.

References

External links

Philadelphia Phillies players
Major League Baseball pitchers
Northwestern Wildcats baseball players
Indianapolis Hoosiers (minor league) players
1913 births
1991 deaths
Baseball players from Chicago